WXXD-LP (92.9 FM) was a radio station licensed to serve Beloit, Wisconsin, United States. The station's license was cancelled on September 18, 2013, after having been silent for longer than a year. The station's broadcast license was held by the St. Jerome Educational Association and it aired a Roman Catholic radio format.

The station was assigned the call sign WXXD-LP by the Federal Communications Commission on July 6, 2006.

References

External links
 

Defunct radio stations in the United States
Radio stations disestablished in 2013
Radio stations established in 2008
Beloit, Wisconsin
XXD-LP
XXD-LP
Defunct religious radio stations in the United States
2008 establishments in Wisconsin
2013 disestablishments in Wisconsin
XXD-LP